In Buddhism, Bhūmi (Sanskrit: भूमि 'foundation', Chinese: 地 'land' ) is the 32nd and 33rd place (10th and 11th in simple count) on the outgoing's process of Mahayana awakening. Each stage represents a level of attainment in that case, and serves as a basis for the next one. Each level marks a definite advancement in one's training that is accompanied by progressively greater power and wisdom. Buddhist monks who arrived at Bhūmi were originally called śrāvakas, in opposition to Brahminism. Śakro devānām and Trāyastriṃśa are together called "Bhūmi nivāsin".

The ten bodhisattva stages are also called vihara ('dwelling').

Ten bhūmis of the Daśabhūmika Sūtra 
The Daśabhūmika Sūtra refers to the following ten bhūmis. 

The first bhūmi, the Very Joyous. (Skt. pramuditā), in which one rejoices at realizing a partial aspect of the truth;
The second bhūmi, the Stainless. (Skt. vimalā), in which one is free from all defilement;
The third bhūmi, the Light-Maker. (Skt. prabhākarī), in which one radiates the light of wisdom;
The fourth bhūmi, the Radiant Intellect. (Skt. arciṣmatī), in which the radiant flame of wisdom burns away earthly desires;
The fifth bhūmi, the Difficult to Master. (Skt. sudurjayā), in which one surmounts the illusions of darkness, or ignorance as the Middle Way;
The sixth bhūmi, the Manifest. (Skt. abhimukhī) in which supreme wisdom begins to manifest;
The seventh bhūmi, the Gone Afar. (Skt. dūraṃgamā), in which one rises above the states of the Two vehicles;
The eighth bhūmi, the Immovable. (Skt. acalā), in which one dwells firmly in the truth of the Middle Way and cannot be perturbed by anything;
The ninth bhūmi, the Good Intelligence. (Skt. sādhumatī), in which one preaches the Law freely and without restriction;
The tenth bhūmi, the Cloud of Doctrine. (Skt. dharmameghā), in which one benefits all sentient beings with the Law (Dharma), just as a cloud sends down rain impartially on all things.

The first bhūmi, the Very Joyous 
The First bhūmi, called "Very Joyous", is attained with the first direct perception of emptiness (Sunyata) and is simultaneous with entry into the third of the five paths to awakening, the path of seeing. It is called "very joyous" because the bodhisattva works at the perfections of generosity and develops the ability to give away everything without regret and with no thought of praise or reward (for themselves). All phenomena are viewed as empty and as subject to decay, suffering, and death, and so bodhisattvas lose all attachment to them. According to Tsong Khapa, first level bodhisattvas directly understand that persons do not exist by way of their own nature. Due to this, they overcome the false idea that the five aggregates constitute a truly existent person. They also eliminate predispositions toward corrupted ethics so completely that they will not arise again.

Despite having directly and correctly perceived emptiness, bodhisattvas on the first level are primarily motivated by faith. They train in ethics in order to cleanse their minds of negativity and so they prepare themselves for the cultivation of mundane meditative absorption that comes on the second level.

The second bhūmi, the Stainless 
Bodhisattvas on the second level, the "Stainless", perfect ethics and overcome all tendencies towards engagement in negative actions. Their control becomes so complete that even in dreams they have no immoral thoughts. According to Tsong Khapa for such a bodhisattva, "on all occasions of waking and dreaming his movements or activities of body, speech and mind are pure of even subtle infractions...he fulfills the three paths of virtuous actions-abandoning killing, stealing, and sexual misconduct-with his body; the middle four-abandons lying, divisive talk, harsh speech, and senseless chatter-with his speech; and the last three-abandoning covetousness, harmful intent, and wrong views-with his mind. Not only does he refrain from what is prohibited but he also fulfills all the positive achievements related to proper ethics."

And according to Nāgārjuna,
The second is called the Stainless
Because all ten [virtuous] actions
Of body, speech, and mind are stainless
And they naturally abide in those [deeds of ethics].
Through the maturation of those [good qualities]
The perfection of ethics becomes supreme.
They become Universal Monarchs helping beings,
Masters of the glorious four continents and of the seven precious objects.

Because of this, the bodhisattva's mind becomes purified and equanimous, which is a prerequisite for training in the four rūpadhyānas ("form" meditative absorptions i.e. those correlated with the form realm) and the four arūpadhyānas (formless absorptions).

The third bhūmi, the Light-Maker 
Tsong Khapa states that the third bhūmi is called the "Light-Maker" because when it is attained "the fire of wisdom burning all the fuel of objects of knowledge arises along with a light which by nature is able to extinguish all elaborations of duality during meditative equipoise." Bodhisattvas on this level cultivate the perfection of patience. Their equanimity becomes so profound that

even if someone...cuts from the body of this bodhisattva not just flesh but also bone, not in large sections but bit by bit, not continually but pausing in between, and not finishing in a short time but cutting over a long period, the bodhisattva would not get angry at the mutilator.

The Bodhisattva realizes that his tormentor is motivated by afflicted thoughts and is sowing seeds of his own future suffering. As a result, the bodhisattva feels not anger, but a deep sadness and compassion for this cruel person, who is unaware of the operations of karma. Trainees on the third level overcome all tendencies toward anger, and never react with hatred (or even annoyance) to any harmful acts or words. Rather, their equanimity remains constant, and all sentient beings are viewed with love and compassion:

All anger and resentment rebound on the person who generates them, and they do nothing to eliminate harms that one has already experienced. They are counterproductive in that they destroy one's peace of mind and lead to unfavorable future situations. There is nothing to be gained through anger and resentment, revenge does nothing to change the past, and so the bodhisattva avoids them.

Bodhisattvas on this level also train in the four form meditations, the four formless meditations, and the four immeasurables, and the higher knowledges.

The fourth bhūmi, the Radiant Intellect 
On the fourth level, the "Radiant Intellect", bodhisattvas cultivate the perfection of effort and eliminate afflictions. According to Wonch'uk, this level is so named because fourth bhumi bodhisattvas "constantly emit the radiance of exalted wisdom." He also cites Maitreya's Ornament for the Mahayana Sutras, which explains that bodhisattvas on this level burn up the afflictive obstructions and the obstructions to omniscience with the radiance of their wisdom. They enter into progressively deeper meditative absorptions and attain a powerful mental pliancy as a result. This eliminates laziness and increases their ability to practice meditation for extended periods of time. They destroy deeply rooted afflictions and cultivate the thirty-seven factors of awakening.

Through training in these thirty-seven practices, bodhisattvas develop great skill in meditative absorptions and cultivate wisdom, while weakening the artificial and innate conceptions of true existence.

The fifth bhūmi, Difficult to Master 
The fifth level is called the "Difficult to Master" because it involves practices that are so arduous and require a great deal of effort to perfect. It is also called the "Difficult to Overcome" because when one has completed the training of this level one has profound wisdom and insight that are difficult to surpass or undermine. According to Nāgārjuna,The fifth is called the Extremely Difficult to Overcome
Since all evil ones find it extremely hard to conquer him;
He becomes skilled in knowing the subtle
Meanings of the noble truths and so forth.
Bodhisattvas on this level cultivate the perfection of samadhi. They develop strong powers of meditative stabilization and overcome tendencies toward distraction. They achieve mental one-pointedness and they perfect calm abiding. They also fully penetrate the meanings of the Four Noble Truths and the two truths (conventional truths and ultimate truths) and perceive all phenomena as empty, transient and prone to suffering.

The sixth bhūmi, the Manifest 
The sixth level is called the "Manifest" because the bodhisattva clearly perceives the workings of dependent arising and directly understands "the signless" (Mtshan ma med pa, Tibetan. Animitta, Sanskrit). The signless refers to the fact that phenomena seem to possess their apparent qualities by way of their own nature, but when one examines this appearance one realizes that all qualities are merely mentally imputed and not a part of the nature of the objects they appear to characterize.

As a result of these understandings bodhisattvas manifest meditative wisdom and avoid attachment to either cyclic existence or nirvana. Having overcome all attachments, bodhisattvas on this level can attain nirvana, but because of the force of the mind of awakening they decide to remain in the world in order to benefit other sentient beings. They cultivate the Perfection of Wisdom, through which they perceive all phenomena as lacking inherent existence, as being like dreams, illusions, reflections, or magically created objects. All notions of "I" and "other" are transcended, along with conceptions of "inherent existence" and "inherent nonexistence." These sixth-level bodhisattvas abide in contemplation of suchness, with minds that are undisturbed by false ideas.

The seventh bhūmi, the Gone Afar 
Bodhisattvas on the seventh level develop the ability to contemplate signlessness uninterruptedly and enter into advanced meditative absorptions for extended periods of time, thus passing beyond both the mundane and supramundane paths of śrāvakas and Pratyekabuddhas (Hearers and solitary realizers). For this reason, this level is called the "Gone Afar." According to Nāgārjuna, The seventh is the Gone Afar because
The number of his qualities has increased,
Moment by moment he can enter
The equipoise of cessation,
On this level bodhisattvas perfect their skill in means of meditation and practice (Thabs la mkhas pa, Tibetan; Upaya-Kausalya, Sanskrit), which is their ability to cleverly adapt their teaching tactics to the individual proclivities and needs of their audiences. They also develop the ability to know the thoughts of others, and in every moment are able to practice all the perfections. All thoughts and actions are free from afflictions, and they constantly act spontaneously and effectively for the benefit of others.

The eighth bhūmi, the Immovable 
The eighth level is called the "Immovable" because bodhisattvas overcome all afflictions regarding signs and their minds are always completely absorbed in the dharma.  At this level, a bodhisattva has achieved nirvana. According to Nāgārjuna,The eighth is the Immovable, the youthful stage,
Through nonconceptuality he is immovable;
And the spheres of his body, speech and mind's
Activities are inconceivable.
Because they are fully acquainted with signlessness, their minds are not moved by ideas of signs. Eighth Bhumi bodhisattvas are said to be "irreversible", because there is no longer any possibility that they might waver on the path or backslide. They are destined for full buddhahood, and there are no longer any inclinations to seek a personal nirvana. They cultivate the "perfection of aspiration", which means that they undertake to fulfill various vows, due to which they accumulate the causes of further virtues. Although they resolve to work for the benefit of others and they pervade the universe with feelings of friendliness toward all sentient beings, these bodhisattvas have transcended any tendency to misunderstand anatta.

Their understanding of emptiness is so complete that it overturns innate delusions, and reality appears in a completely new light. They enter into meditation on emptiness with little effort. Bodhisattvas on this level are compared to people who have awakened from dreams, and all their perceptions are influenced by this new awareness. They attain the meditative state called "forbearance regarding non-arisen phenomena", due to which they no longer think in terms of inherent causes or inherent causelessness. They also develop the ability to manifest in various forms in order to instruct others. Compassion and skillful means are automatic and spontaneous. There is no need to plan or contemplate how best to benefit others, since bodhisattvas on the eighth level automatically react correctly to every situation.

The ninth bhūmi, the Good Intelligence 
From this point on, bodhisattvas move quickly toward awakening. Before this stage, progress was comparatively slow, like that of a boat being towed through a harbour. On the eighth through tenth bhumi, however, bodhisattvas make huge strides toward buddhahood, like a ship that reaches the ocean and unfurls its sails. On the ninth level, they fully understand the three vehicles - hearers, solitary realizers, and bodhisattvas - and perfect the ability to teach the doctrine. According to the Sutra Explaining the Thought,Because of attaining faultlessness and very extensive intelligence in terms of mastery of teaching the doctrine in all aspects, the ninth level is called the "Good Intelligence."
Ninth bhūmi bodhisattvas also acquire the "four analytical knowledges"-of fundamental concepts, meaning, grammar, and exposition. Due to this, they develop wondrous eloquence and skill in presenting doctrinal teachings. Their intelligence surpasses that of all humans and gods, and they comprehend all names, words, meanings, and languages. They can understand any question from any being. They also have the ability to answer them with a single sound, which is understood by each being according to its capacities. On this level they also cultivate the perfection of virya, which means that because of the strength of their mastery of the four analytical knowledges and their meditation they are able to develop paramitas energetically and to practice them continually without becoming fatigued.

The tenth bhūmi, the Cloud of Dharma 
On the tenth bhūmi, bodhisattvas overcome the subtlest traces of the afflictions. Like a cloud that pours rain on the earth, these bodhisattvas spread the dharma in all directions, and each sentient being absorbs what it needs in order to grow spiritually. Thus Nāgārjuna states that
The tenth is the Cloud of Dharma because
The rain of excellent doctrine falls,
The Bodhisattva is consecrated
With light by the Buddhas.

At this stage bodhisattvas enter into progressively deeper meditative absorptions and develop limitless powers with regard to magical formulas. They cultivate the perfection of exalted wisdom, which, according to Asaṅga, enables them to increase their exalted wisdom. This in turn strengthens the other perfections. As a result, they become established in the joy of the doctrine.

They acquire perfect bodies, and their minds are cleansed of the subtlest traces of the afflictions. They manifest in limitless forms for the benefit of others and transcend the ordinary laws of time and space. They are able to place entire world systems in a single pore, without diminishing them or increasing the size of the pore. When they do this, the beings inhabiting the worlds feel no discomfort, and only those who are advanced bodhisattvas even notice.

Bodhisattvas on this level receive a form of empowerment from innumerable buddhas. This is called "great rays of light", because the radiance of these bodhisattvas shines in all directions. This empowerment helps them in removing the remaining obstructions to omniscience and gives them added confidence and strength. At the final moment of this stage they enter into a meditative state called the "vajralike meditative stabilization", in which the subtlest remaining obstacles to buddhahood are overcome. They arise from this concentration as Buddhas.

Six bhūmis in the Yogācārabhūmi 
The Yogacara compendium of yogic praxis, the Yogācārabhūmi, contains a subsection on the bodhisattva path (the Bodhisattvabhūmi), which lists six  bhūmis:

 The bhūmi of practicing with ascertainment (adhimukticaryābhūmi, shèngjiě xíng dì 勝解行地, mos pas spyod pa'i sa), 
 The bhūmi of pure exalted conviction (śuddhādhyāśayabhūmi, jìng shèngyìyào dì 淨勝意樂地, lhag pa'i bsam pa dag pa'i sa),
 The bhūmi of accomplishing practices (caryāpratipattibhūmi, xíng zhèngxíng dì 行正行地, spyod la 'jug pa'i sa), 
 The bhūmi of certainty (niyatabhūmi, duò juédìng dì 墮決定 地, nges par gyur pa'i sa), 
 The bhūmi of practicing with certainty (niyatacaryābhūmi, juédìng xíng zhèngxíng dì 決定行正行地, nges pa'i spyod pa'i sa)
 The bhūmi of reaching perfection (niṣṭhāgamanabhūmi, dào jiūjìng dì 到究竟地, mthar thug par 'gyur ba'i sa).

Five Paths
The bhūmis are often categorized with or merged into, the separate schema of the "five paths". The main ideas of this schema were inherited by Yogacara from the Sarvāstivāda Vaibhāṣika Abhidharma texts as well as Vasubadhu's Abhidharmakośakārikā (AKBh).<ref name=":0">Watanabe, Chikafumi (2000), A Study of Mahayanasamgraha III: The Relation of Practical Theories and Philosophical Theories.” Ph.D. dissertation, The University of Calgary, pp. 38-40.</ref> This schema continues to be developed in Yogacara texts like Asanga's Mahāyānasaṃgraha (MS), where it is given a more Mahayanist explanation and becomes tied to the bodhisattva path and the bhūmis.

The Five Paths (pañcamārga, Wylie Tibetan lam lnga), are:Watanabe, Chikafumi, A Study of Mahayanasamgraha III: The Relation of Practical Theories and Philosophical Theories, 2000, pp. 40-65.Mokṣa-bhāgīya (The state leading up to release) or Saṃbhāra-mārga (path of accumulation, tshogs lam). According to Vasubandhu's AKBh, in this path, one practices morality and contentment, learns and reflects on the teaching, keeps themselves free from unwholesome thinking, and practices the four foundations of mindfulness. In the Tibetan tradition, persons on the path are said to possess a strong desire to overcome suffering, either their own or others and renounce the worldly life.Nirveda-bhāgīya (The state leading up to penetration) or Prayoga-mārga (The path of preparation, sbyor lam). According to the AKBh, in this stage, one observes the four noble truths in terms of its sixteen aspects. In the Tibetan tradition, this path is when one begins to practice meditation and gains analytical knowledge of emptiness.Darśana-mārga (The path of seeing or insight, mthong lam). According to the AKBh, in this path one continues to observe the four noble truths until one realizes it and abandons eighty eight afflictions (kleshas). In Asanga's MS, this stage is when one realizes that all things are mere mental presentations (vijñapti matra), which leads to the first instance of the turning of the basis (āśraya-parāvṛtti). In the Tibetan tradition, this is when one practices samatha and realizes emptiness directly. Bhāvanā-mārga, (The path of cultivation, sgom lam). According to the AKBh, in this stage, one continues to practice and abandons 10 further kleshas. In the MS, one practices in this stage by applying the antidotes (pratipakṣa) to all of the obstructions (sarvā varaṇa) and continues the process of the turning of the basis (āśraya-parāvṛtti).Aśaikṣā-mārga (The path of no more learning or consummation, mi slob pa’i lam or thar phyin pa'i lam) also known as Niṣṭhā-mārga (in the MS). Persons on this path have completely freed themselves of all obstructions and afflictions and are thus perfected or fulfilled (niṣṭhā). According to the MS, one has achieved the bodies of a Buddha.

 As part of the Bodhisattva path 
Passage through the grounds and paths begins with Bodhicitta, the wish to liberate all sentient beings. Aspiring Bodhicitta becomes Engaging Bodhicitta upon actual commitment to the Bodhisattva vows. With these steps, the practitioner becomes a Bodhisattva, and enters upon the paths.

Before attaining the ten grounds, the bodhisattva traverses the first two of the five Mahayana paths:

The path of accumulation
The path of preparation

The ten grounds of the bodhisattva are grouped within the three subsequent paths:
Bhūmi 1: The path of seeing
Bhūmi 2-7: The path of meditation
Bhūmi 8-10: The path of no more learning

In Hua-yen Buddhism there are some 40 previous stages before the first bhumi:
 10 faiths
 10 abodes
 10 practices
 10 merit-transferences

In Tientai Buddhism the practitioner of the so-called "perfect teaching" is equal in attainment to arhats by just the 4th faith.

Mahayana literature often features an enumeration of "two obstructions" (Wylie: sgrib gnyis): 
 The "obstructions of delusive emotions" (Sanskrit: kleśa-varaṇa, Wylie: nyon-mongs-pa'i sgrib-ma)
 The "obstructions to knowledge" (Sanskrit: jñeyāvaraṇa, Wylie: shes-bya'i sgrib-ma'').

The obstruction of delusive emotions  is overcome at the attainment of the path of seeing, and the obstructions to knowledge are overcome over the course of the path of meditation. This is not a statement agreed upon by all Buddhist schools, e.g. Korean Son's Kihwa states that the obstructions to knowledge are overcome by the 10th bhumi.

Additional bhūmi
Various Vajrayana lineages of tantra recognize bhumis after the 10th bhumi.

Within the Dzogchen and Mahamudra schools of tantra there are either thirteen or sixteen bhumis depending on the lineage. 

One system of Dzogchen/Mahamudra presents thirteen bhumis:
 eleventh bhumi of Universal Light  
 twelfth bhumi of the Lotus of Nonattachment    
 thirteenth bhumi of the Vajra Holder.   

Another system of Dzogchen presents sixteen bhumis:
 eleventh bhumi of Universal Radiance/Light
 twelfth bhumi of the Lotus of Nonattachment 
 thirteenth bhumi of the Gatherings of Rotating Syllables 
 fourteenth bhumi of the Great Samadhi
 fifteenth bhumi of the Vajra Holder
 sixteenth bhumi of the Unexcelled Wisdom

See also
 Buddhist Paths to liberation

References

Bibliography

 
 
 
 
 
 

Buddhist philosophical concepts
Stage theories